Matthew Whatley (born January 7, 1996) is an American professional baseball catcher in the Texas Rangers organization.

Amateur career
Whatley attended Claremore High School in Claremore, Oklahoma. He received one offer to play college baseball in NCAA Division I, from Oral Roberts University. He played for the Oral Roberts Golden Eagles. In 2016, he played collegiate summer baseball in the Cape Cod Baseball League for the Yarmouth-Dennis Red Sox. In 2017, he won the Johnny Bench Award.

The Texas Rangers selected Whatley in the third round of the 2017 MLB draft. He signed with the Rangers, receiving a $517,100 signing bonus.

Professional career
He spent 2017 with both the AZL Rangers and the Spokane Indians, posting a combined .295 batting average with six home runs and 28 RBIs in 44 games between the two clubs. Whatley began the 2018 season with the Down East Wood Ducks of the Class A-Advanced Carolina League and was reassigned to the Hickory Crawdads of the Class A South Atlantic League at the end of the season. In 52 games between both teams, Whatley hit .179 with three home runs and 14 RBIs. Whatley was assigned back to Hickory for the 2019 season, hitting .234/.349./321/.670 with four home runs, 49 RBIs, and 29 stolen bases. Whatley played in the Arizona Fall League for the Surprise Saguaros following the 2019 season. Whatley was named the Texas Rangers 2019 Minor League Defender of the Year. Whatley did not play in a game in 2020 due to the cancellation of the Minor League Baseball season because of the COVID-19 pandemic. He spent the 2021 season with the Frisco RoughRiders of the Double-A Central, hitting .203/.316/.282/.598 with four home runs and 14 RBIs. He split the 2022 season between Frisco and the Round Rock Express of the Triple-A Pacific Coast League, hitting a combined .228/.287/.328/.615 with 4 home runs and 16 RBI.

References

External links

Oral Roberts Golden Eagles bio

1996 births
Living people
People from Claremore, Oklahoma
Baseball players from Oklahoma
Baseball catchers
Oral Roberts Golden Eagles baseball players
Yarmouth–Dennis Red Sox players
Arizona League Rangers players
Spokane Indians players
Hickory Crawdads players
Down East Wood Ducks players
Frisco RoughRiders players
Surprise Saguaros players
Round Rock Express players